Giles Alfred Lutz (March 1910–June 1982) was a prolific author of fiction in the Western genre.  Born in March 1910 in Missouri, United States, Lutz for many years wrote short stories about the American West that were published in pulp magazines.  His story "Get a Wild Horse Hunter", an example of his pulp fiction writing, appeared in the June 1952 edition of the magazine Western Novels and Short Stories.  In the mid-1950s Lutz made the transition to full-length novels, and until his death in June 1982, published numerous stories about the American West.  In 1962, Lutz won the Western Writers of America Golden Spur Award for his novel, The Honyocker.

Lutz wrote under several pseudonyms during his pulp fiction career, including under the names: "James B. Chaffin," "Wade Everett (with Will Cook)," "Alex Hawk," "Hunter," "Hunter Ingram," "Reese Sullivan," and "Gene Thompson."  Under the pseudonym "Brad Curtis," Lutz wrote steamy pulp novels in the erotica genre. He also wrote a lot of sports fiction for the pulp magazines, in titles like Ace Sports, Complete Sports, and Football Stories.

Bibliography

As Giles A. Lutz

Western Novels 
Fight Or Run (1954)
The Golden Bawd (1956)
To Hell and Texas (1956)
Fury Trail (1957)
Gun the Man Down (1957)
Relentless Gun (1958)
Outcast Gun (1958)
The Homing Bullet (1959)
Law of the Trigger (1959)
The Challenger (1960)
Stranger in My Bed (1960)
The Wild Quarry (1961)
The Long Cold Wind (1962)
The Golden Land (1963)
Halfway to Hell (1963)
Killer's Trail (1963)
Range Feud (1963)
The Blind Trail (1964)
The Bleeding Land (1965)
Nemesis of Circle A (1965)
Deadly Like a .45 (1966)
The Demanding Land (1966)
The Hardy Breed (1966)
The Magnificent Failure (1967)
The Trouble Borrower (1968)
The Vengeance Ghost (1968)
Wild Runs the River (1968)
The Deadly Deputy (1969)
The Honyocker (1969)
Montana Crossing (1970)
Man On the Run (1971)
The Stranger (1972)
The Unbeaten (1972)
Gun Rich (1973)
The Outsider (1973)
Lonely Ride (1973)
Blood Feud (1973)
The Grudge (1974)
The Offenders (1974)
Reprisal! (1974)
The Black Day (1974)
Stagecoach to Hell (1975)
My Brothers Keeper (1975)
The Stubborn Breed (1975)
A Drifting Man (1976)
Night of the Cattlemen (1976)
The Way Homeward (1977)
A Time for Vengeance (1977)
Turn Around (1978)
The Ragged Edge (1978)
The Shoot Out (1978)
Lure of the Outlaw Trail (1979)
Lure of the Trail (1980)
The Trespassers (1980)
Fort Apache (1980)
Thieves' Brand (1981)
The Echo (1981)
Forked Tongue (1981)
Man Hunt (1981)
Great Railroad War (1982)
Smash the Wild Bunch (1982)
War on the Range (1982)
The Feud (1982)
The Tangled Web (1983)

Omnibus
Vengeance Ghost / Gun Rich (1980)

Anthologies 
Gun Rich / Battling Buckeroos (1962) (with Tom West)

As Brad Curtis

Erotic Novels 
Man Trap (1963)
For Services Rendered (1964)
Man-Tamer (1964)
Private Property (1964)
The Golden Greed (1965)
The Love Goddess (1965)
Night Shift (1965)
A Female Female (1966)
Jody (1966)
Live and Let Live (1966)
Pleasure Play (1967)

External links
Giles A. Lutz

20th-century American novelists
American male novelists
Western (genre) writers
People from Missouri
Novelists from Missouri
1910 births
1982 deaths
Lutz, Giles, A.
American male short story writers
20th-century American short story writers
20th-century American male writers